Fast tank may refer to:

 Cruiser tank, the British interwar concept of mechanized cavalry and its designs
 BT tank, the Soviet fast light tank